Dwarhatta is a village and a gram panchayat in the Haripal CD block  in the Chandannagore subdivision of Hooghly district in the Indian state of West Bengal.

Geography

Location
Dwarhatta is located at

Urbanisation
In Chandannagore subdivision 58.52% of the population is rural and the urban population is 41.48%. Chandannagore subdivision has 1 municipal corporation, 3 municipalities and 7 census towns. The single municipal corporation is Chandernagore Municipal Corporation. The municipalities are Tarakeswar Municipality, Bhadreswar Municipality and Champdany Municipality. Of the three CD Blocks in Chandannagore subdivision, Tarakeswar CD Block is wholly rural, Haripal CD Block is predominantly rural with just 1 census town, and Singur CD Block is slightly less rural with 6 census towns. Polba Dadpur and Dhaniakhali CD Blocks of Chinsurah subdivision (included in the map alongside) are wholly rural. The municipal areas are industrialised. All places marked in the map are linked in the larger full screen map.

Demographics
According to the 2011 Census of India, Dwarhatta had a total population of 3,799 of which 1,936 (51%) were males and 1,843 (49%) were females. Population in the age range 0–6 years was 370. The total number of literate persons in Kotalpur was 2,800 (81.66% of the population over 6 years).

Culture
David J. McCutchion describes several temples at Dwarhatta:
Rare examples of pancharatna temples with slender turrets are there at Dwarhatta
Raj-Rajeswar temple (1728) of Singha Roy family at Dwarhatta having atchala with porch on triple archway  - it has tight scroll work above the archways but figures along the base and round the façade
Pancharatna temples with ridged rekha turrets at Dwarhatta have facades fully decorated with figures

The Rajrajeswara temple (at Sr No S-WB-52) at Dwarhatta is included in the List of State Protected Monuments in West Bengal by the Archaeological Survey of India.

Dwarhatta picture gallery

References

External links

Villages in Hooghly district